Christina Bianco is an American actress, singer and impressionist. Bianco is best known for her theatrical work, television appearances and YouTube videos in which she impersonates celebrities, both singing and speaking.

Career
In 2015, Bianco starred in the one-woman, multi-character comedy Application Pending, off-Broadway at the West Side Theatre for which she received her second Drama Desk Award nomination in the Outstanding Solo Performance category. She has appeared in Forbidden Broadway on the West End at London's Vaudeville Theatre, and also starred in the off-Broadway shows Forbidden Broadway Goes to Rehab and Newsical. For her work in Forbidden Broadway Goes To Rehab, Bianco was nominated for the Drama Desk Award for Outstanding Featured Actress in a Musical, but lost to Haydn Gwynne, who won the award for her performance in Billy Elliot the Musical. Bianco originated the role of Dora in the national tour of Dora the Explorer Live, and was a contestant on season six of America's Got Talent, but received no air time. Additional New York credits include playing Missy in The Marvelous Wonderettes and It Must Be Him.

Bianco played the recurring role of Bianca on the sitcom Impress Me on POP TV. The show was produced by Rainn Wilson and SoulPancake and starred Ross Marquand and Jim Meskimen.

In 2016, she appeared as Mindy on Signed, Sealed, Delivered on the Hallmark Channel, Movies & Mysteries. She also appeared on Watch What Happens Live on Bravo.

From August 2016, Bianco began touring the United Kingdom with her one-woman show titled "Me, Myself and Everyone Else", performing at the Edinburgh Fringe Festival in Edinburgh from August 22 to 27, before traveling around the country. The tour includes dates in Somerset, Manchester, Blackpool, Leeds, County Durham, Aberdeen, Glasgow, Dundee, Belfast, Cardiff and London, before finishing in Brighton on September 18.

In December 2017, Bianco wrote a Christmas concert titled "O Come All Ye Divas" for a 15 performance run at Charing Cross Theatre in London. The musical arrangements were created by Bianco and her long time accompanist, Joe Louis Robinson.

Christina starred as The Narrator in Joseph And The Amazing Technicolor Dreamcoat at the Drury Lane Theatre (Illinois). 

Christina's Celine Dion and Julie Andrews impressions can be heard on RuPaul's Drag Race: All Stars Season 3, episode 2, "Drag Divas Live."

In early 2018, Christina performed to critical acclaim at the Adelaide Cabaret Festival. In December 2018, Christina made her Sydney Opera House debut with her Christmas show "O Come All Ye Divas." Soon after, she returned to Australia in January 2019 to perform "Me Myself And Everyone Else" as part of [Perth Fringeworld].

In 2018, Christina recorded and released her first live album, "Life Of The Party." The album was crowdfunded by her fans through Indiegogo.

She has publicly stated that she plans to return to the Edinburgh Fringe Festival in 2019, before her second UK tour.

Christina starred in the Paris premiere of the Broadway musical Funny Girl at the Théâtre Marigny through early March 2020. The reviews have unanimously praised her performance as well as the production with the New York Times noting that “much like Streisand, who won an Academy Award for the 1968 film adaptation, Bianco pours irresistible life into the role.”

Beginning in March 2022, Christina will play the role of LV in the new UK touring production of The Rise And Fall Of Little Voice.https://playbill.com/article/christina-bianco-to-star-in-uk-tour-of-the-rise-and-fall-of-little-voice

Voice Impressions and Major Television Performances
In August 2013, a video of Bianco singing "Total Eclipse of the Heart" received over seven million YouTube views, due in part to a tweet by Shonda Rhimes In the video, Bianco does voice impressions of nineteen different singers. Bianco performed a version of "Total Eclipse of the Heart" on The Ellen Degeneres Show in September 2013. In May 2014, she performed the song in front of its original singer, Bonnie Tyler, on the popular UK ITV program, The Paul O'Grady Show. One of Bianco's previous videos, an "Impression Reel" of Katy Perry's "Firework", also includes impressions of famous female singers.

In February 2014, Bianco released a video of herself singing "Let It Go" from Disney's Frozen and the video soon went viral gaining over 6 million views. In October 2014, Bianco gained attention for her "diva" rendition of the CeeLo Green hit "Forget You".

In February 2015, Bianco appeared on The Today Show  She sang "Natural Woman" on The Queen Latifah Show in August, 2014. Christina has also performed twice on the ITV program This Morning once in September 2014 and again in May 2015.

On May 5, 2016, Christina performed on The Meredith Vieira Show, Season 2, episode 124. Her segment was titled "The Woman With A Thousand Voices" and she performed Hello (Adele song) in the voices of various celebrities. Her accompanist for this was Brad Simmons.  Christina also provided impression vocals for two episode 99 and 116.

In the fall of 2018, Christina appeared on British television on the iTV series "The Imitation Game" alongside Debra Stephenson, Rory Bremner and Jon Culshaw.

References

Further reading

External links
 
 

American musical theatre actresses
Tisch School of the Arts alumni
People from Suffern, New York
Living people
1982 births